Standing in the Shadows of Motown is a 2002 American documentary film directed by Paul Justman that recounts the story of The Funk Brothers, the uncredited and largely unheralded studio musicians who were the house band that Berry Gordy hand-picked in 1959.

Background
The Funk Brothers recorded and performed on Motown's recordings from 1959 to 1972. The film was inspired by the 1989 book Standing in the Shadows of Motown: The Life and Music of Legendary Bassist James Jamerson, a bass guitar instruction book by Allan Slutsky, which features a biography of James Jamerson along with his bass lines.

The film covers the Funk Brothers' career via interviews with surviving band members, archival footage and still photos, dramatized re-enactments, and narration by actor Andre Braugher. The film also features new live performances of several Motown hit songs, with the Funk Brothers backing up Gerald Levert, Me'shell Ndegeocello, Joan Osborne, Ben Harper, Bootsy Collins, Chaka Khan, and Montell Jordan.

The impetus behind making the film was to bring these influential players out of anonymity. In addition to bassist James Jamerson, The Funk Brothers consisted of the following musicians: Jack Ashford (percussion); Bob Babbitt (bass); Joe Hunter (keyboards); Uriel Jones (drums); Joe Messina (guitar); Eddie Willis (guitar); Richard "Pistol" Allen (drums); Benny "Papa Zita" Benjamin (drums); Eddie "Bongo" Brown (percussion); Johnny Griffith (keyboards); Earl Van Dyke (keyboards); and Robert White (guitar).

The Funk Brothers produced more hits than The Beatles, The Rolling Stones, The Beach Boys and Elvis Presley combined. It was their sound, according to Mary Wilson (of The Supremes), that backed The Temptations, The Supremes, The Miracles, the Four Tops, Gladys Knight & the Pips, Marvin Gaye, Stevie Wonder, and Mary Wells, among other noteworthy bands during their tenure from 1959 to 1973.

Soundtrack album 

Released by Hip-O Records.
 "(Love Is Like a) Heat Wave" – Joan Osborne
 "You've Really Got a Hold on Me" – Meshell Ndegeocello
 "Do You Love Me" – Bootsy Collins
 "Bernadette" – The Funk Brothers
 "Reach Out I'll Be There" – Gerald Levert
 "Ain't Too Proud to Beg" - Ben Harper
 "Shotgun" – Gerald Levert featuring Tom Scott
 "What Becomes of the Brokenhearted" – Joan Osborne
 "I Heard It Through the Grapevine" – Ben Harper
 "You Keep Me Hangin' On" – The Funk Brothers
 "Cool Jerk" – Bootsy Collins
 "Cloud Nine" – Meshell Ndegeocello
 "What's Going On" – Chaka Khan
 Band Introduction/"Ain't No Mountain High Enough" – Chaka Khan & Montell Jordan
 "The Flick" – Earl Van Dyke
 "Boom Boom" – John Lee Hooker [Deluxe Edition bonus track]
 "(Your Love Keeps Lifting Me) Higher and Higher" – Jackie Wilson [Deluxe Edition bonus track]
 "Scorpio" – Dennis Coffey & The Detroit Guitar Band [Deluxe Edition bonus track]

In The Snakepit: Naked Instrumental Remixes Of The Original Hits
Deluxe Edition bonus CD, 2004
 "Funk Brothers in the House" – Bootsy Collins
 "Standing in the Shadows of Love" – The Funk Brothers
 Dialogue: Joe Hunter, in the beginning – Joe Hunter
 "The One Who Really Loves You" – The Funk Brothers
 "Pride and Joy" – The Funk Brothers
 Dialogue: Robert White invents a classic – Robert White
 "My Girl" – The Funk Brothers
 "Love Is Like an Itching in My Heart" – The Funk Brothers
 "Don't Mess with Bill" (Live) – The Funk Brothers
 "The Hunter Gets Captured by the Game" – The Funk Brothers
 Dialogue: Eddie, Uriel and Jack speaking the "language" – Eddie Willis, Uriel Jones & Jack Ashford
 "I Second That Emotion" – The Funk Brothers
 "I Was Made to Love Her" – The Funk Brothers
 Dialogue: "Pistol" picks up the beat – Richard "Pistol" Allen
 "I Heard It Through the Grapevine" (Gladys Knight & the Pips version) – The Funk Brothers
 "Home Cookin'" – The Funk Brothers
 "For Once in My Life" – The Funk Brothers
 Dialogue: Jack in the club groove – Jack Ashford
 "I Can't Get Next to You" – The Funk Brothers
 "It's a Shame" – The Funk Brothers
 "Ain't No Mountain High Enough" (Diana Ross version) – The Funk Brothers
 Dialogue: Eddie takes it to the bridge – Eddie Willis
 "Mercy Mercy Me (The Ecology)" – The Funk Brothers
 Dialogue: Feeling the Funk, Brother – Lamont Dozier
 "You're My Everything" – James Jamerson & The Temptations (Bonus Track)

Awards 
 2002 National Society of Film Critics: Best Non-Fiction Film
 2002 New York Film Critics Circle: Best Non-Fiction Film
 2002 Austin Film Festival: Audience Award, Best Documentary Showcase Film
 2003 Maryland Film Festival: Closing Night Selection
 2003 Grammy Award: Best Compilation Soundtrack Album for a Motion Picture, Television or Other Visual Media
 2003 Grammy Award: Best Traditional R&B Vocal Performance, "What's Going On", Chaka Khan & The Funk Brothers

Home media
The film was released on DVD and VHS on April 22, 2003.

References

External links
 Standing in the Shadows of Motown - Official site
 

2000s English-language films
2002 documentary films
2002 films
2002 soundtrack albums
2004 remix albums
American documentary films
Artisan Entertainment films
Documentary films about the music industry
2000s American films
English-language documentary films